Cadar is a Romanian surname. Notable people with the surname include:

Andrei Cadar (born 1937), Romanian equestrian
Anton Cadar (1941–1989), Romanian gymnast

Romanian-language surnames